This is a list of episodes from the fifth season of Barney Miller.

Broadcast history
The season originally aired Thursdays at 9:00-9:30 pm (EST).

Episodes

References

Barney Miller seasons
1978 American television seasons
1979 American television seasons